Mall at Barnes Crossing is a super regional shopping mall located northeast of downtown Tupelo, Mississippi. It is managed and partially owned by David Hocker & Associates and is home to over 90 specialty shops, 5 anchor store tenants, an 8-screen Cinemark movie theater, and a 600-seat food court. The anchor stores are Barnes & Noble, Jos. A. Bank, JCPenney, Ulta Beauty, 2 Belk stores, Cinemark, and Dick's Sporting Goods. There is 1 vacant anchor store that was once Sears.

History
Mall at Barnes Crossing opened March 7, 1990 as the third mall in the Tupelo area. Original anchor stores included Kmart, Belk, and McRae's, along with JCPenney and Sears. Kmart closed in 1996 and was sold to McRae's, which moved its men's clothing and home goods into the former Kmart while retaining women's clothing, children's apparel, and cosmetics at the existing store. Belk later closed and became Parisian, but returned to the mall in 2005 when it acquired both McRae's locations.

Belk also acquired the Parisian chain in 2007, and as a result, the former Parisian at the mall was then closed and became Dick's Sporting Goods in 2008.  In 2008, Barnes & Noble opened and added an additional  to the mall making the official size . Joining them in an updated lifestyle center look were, Coldwater Creek and Jos. A. Bank. The southwest entrance also has been remodeled and it the home of ULTA Beauty and D'Casa Mexican Restaurant. In 2013, CHICO's and Francesca Collection has opened.

On November 8, 2018, it was announced that Sears will be closing this location as part of a plan to close 40 stores nationwide. The store closed in February 2019.

Periphery
David Hocker & Associates also manages an outdoor strip  shopping center called Market Center to the west of the mall, between two major entrances. The center consists of anchors Old Navy and Shoe Carnival. Another outdoor strip shopping center called Barnes Crossing Plaza lies north of the mall, including anchors OfficeMax, TJMaxx, and Hobby Lobby, and Ollie's Bargain Outlet.

References

External links 
 The Mall at Barnes Crossing Homepage

Shopping malls established in 1990
Brookfield Properties
Shopping malls in Mississippi
Buildings and structures in Tupelo, Mississippi
Tourist attractions in Lee County, Mississippi